Mareile Krumbholz (b. 1982 as Mareile Schmidt) is a German organist and music educator.

Life and career 
Krumbholz was a young student at the Robert Schumann Hochschule. After completing her studies of church music, she studied organ, harpsichord and piano pedagogy at the Hochschule für Musik und Tanz Köln and passed all subjects with distinction.

She has made radio recordings, was a scholarship holder and has won prizes in competitions. Concert tours have taken her to the Gewandhaus, to Minsk and to London. In 2010, she performed the complete organ works of Johann Sebastian Bach at twelve concert dates within four weeks in Hürth.

Krumbholz taught organ improvisation at the Cologne University of Music and the State University of Music and Performing Arts Stuttgart. At 27 years of age, she was the youngest professor for organ ever to be appointed in Germany.

References

External links 
 

German classical organists
German women musicians
German performers of early music
Place of birth unknown
1982 births
Living people